ActionSA is a South African political party established by former mayor of Johannesburg, Herman Mashaba, soon after he left the Democratic Alliance.

The party states that it has been established to "set South Africa free from the restraints of a broken political system and build a prosperous, non-racial and secure future for all its people." and that it follows the ideal of "Act as One to build a prosperous, non-racial and secure future for all South Africans."

Formation

Party launch 
On the 29 August 2020, former Mayor of Johannesburg, Herman Mashaba, announced that he had started a new political party. That party would be known as ActionSA and it was intending to run for the three Gauteng metro cities (Johannesburg, Ekurhuleni and Tshwane) in the 2021 local government elections. The party soon gained notoriety as it brought together former politicians who were dissatisfied with big parties such as the DA and ANC. Makhosi Khoza, Vytjie Mentor, André Coetzee and David Tembe were amongst the former ANC politicians who joined the newly formed ActionSA. On 5 October 2020, former DA provincial leader, John Moodey, announced that he had joined ActionSA. Soon, thereafter, he was followed by numerous former DA councillors, along with leaders like Abel Tau, Funzi Ngobeni and former DA Johannesburg youth leader, Lincoln Machaba.

Noting on how many of its leaders came from the DA, the party's inaugural spokesperson said that "the party was not formed as part of a detraction for the DA, but the need to create an alternative towards a shared future."

The party was quickly criticised by, then newly elected leader of the DA, John Steenhuisen, who noted that every time a voter supports a small party like ActionSA, "the net result is the strengthening of the ANC. We've been through this scenario so many times. As soon as the elections are over, voters who tested the waters with one of these new start-ups realise they got zero bang for their buck from a one-man party with a regional footprint, and they return to the DA. But by then the damage is done for the next five years." Steenhuisen's critique was not at these party's policies but rather that they are "too small" to impart any change. This criticism was followed by Steenhuisen's chief-of-staff's opinion piece which labelled ActionSA as "EFF-lite in disguise." In an open letter to Steenhuisen, Moodey criticised this opinion piece and what he called the DA's "race denialism" and defended ActionSA's vision and its leaders reasons from leaving the DA. Moodey claimed that "Herman left the DA because it gave up on the project of being a serious political party that could challenge and unseat the ANC."

IEC registration 
A month after the party was launched, the Independent Electoral Commission (IEC) rejected the party's application to register itself as an official political party. This was due to another party, Party of Action, claiming that ActionSA had stolen its logo. On this claim, Mashaba noted that "[t]he IEC’s decision is based on a perceived similarity with another political party and the use of the SA flag in our logo. We have already written to the IEC, initiating our right to appeal their decision as a result of its incorrect application of the law. We regard the IEC to have acted irrationally in their decision. We submit that our identifying features remain sufficiently different from the Party of Action (POA), a political party that has never contested elections before despite registering."

The party's appeal was again rejected by the IEC on the same basis.

On 13 December 2020, the party was officially registered with the IEC, notably under a new logo.

Youth Advisory Council

On 7 November 2020, the party introduced a youth structure that which was named the Action SA Youth Advisory Council (YAC) that would act as an advisory council to the party in the youth perspective . The national structure was introduced with the chairperson being Hluphi Gafane who was made part of the senate along with Dean Solomon and Thabo Yabohlale who is the Head of Students, with time the party grew with that so did the interest of young people to join and so provincial YAC structures were formed in Gauteng with the chairperson being Reuben Coetzer, Eastern Cape with Amzolele Nkolisa being the chairperson and Limpopo chaired by Tshepo Magoma so far. The YAC still aims to grow in numbers and help solve the issues faced by the young people of South Africa while subsequently reigniting their interest in politics.

Ideology and principles

Values 
According to the party's website, the party has seven core values:

 Electoral reform
 Economic prosperity
 Non-racialism
 Quality education
 Social justice
 Ethical leadership

The party's current main policies focus on what it calls the solution blueprints on:

 Climate change and the environment
 Electoral reform
 Professional public service
 Ethical leadership
 Immigration
 Rule of law
 Land reform and housing
 Quality education
 Social justice
 Non-racialism
 Economic prosperity

Election results

Municipal elections

In the 2021 municipal elections, the party contested a limited number of municipalities, namely the Cities of Johannesburg, Tshwane and Ekurhuleni in Gauteng as well as eThekwini, KwaDukuza and Newcastle in KwaZulu-Natal. It won 90 seats in the six Municipal councils, including a ward in Newcastle.

|-
! Election
! Votes
! %
! Seats
|-
! 2021
| 547,905
| 2.34%
| 90
|-
|}

See also 
South African politics
Democratic Alliance
 African National Congress
 Economic Freedom Fighters

References

2020 establishments in South Africa
Anti-corruption parties
Conservative parties in South Africa
Direct democracy parties
Liberal parties in South Africa
Libertarian parties
Political parties established in 2020
Political parties in South Africa
Political parties based in Johannesburg